Glenn Martin Tilbrook (born 31 August 1957) is an English singer, songwriter and guitarist, best known as the lead singer and guitarist of the English new wave band Squeeze, a band formed in the mid-1970s who broke through in the new wave era at the decade's end. He generally wrote the music for Squeeze's songs, while his writing partner, Chris Difford, wrote the lyrics. In addition to his songwriting skills, Tilbrook is respected both as a singer and an accomplished guitarist.  He was born in Woolwich, London.

Squeeze
Tilbrook formed Squeeze with fellow guitarist and vocalist Chris Difford in the mid-1970s. Difford had placed an advertisement at a local shop looking for a guitarist and Tilbrook was the only person to respond. Tilbrook also recruited school friend Jools Holland to join the band in its early stages.

Tilbrook and Difford would ultimately form a songwriting partnership that was responsible for writing most Squeeze songs, with Tilbrook writing music and Difford writing lyrics. Tilbrook also served as lead guitarist and performed guitar solos on the band's music. On his guitar style, Tilbrook commented:

In 1982 Squeeze had disbanded. The chemistry between Tilbrook and Difford could not be as easily dismissed however, and the ensuing record they made together in 1984 has become the “lost” Squeeze album for many fans. However, the partnership began to fray under the duress of Difford's struggles with addiction and questions over the band's commercial and creative direction. The band would again break up in 1999 and remain dormant until a reunion in 2007.

Difford and Tilbrook
During Squeeze's first hiatus, from approximately 1983 to 1985, Tilbrook wrote, recorded, and toured with Chris Difford, his songwriting partner from Squeeze. Their album, Difford & Tilbrook was originally released in 1984, and remastered and reissued in 2006.

Solo career and outside Squeeze
Tilbrook contributed guitar on 1976 demos for punk band The Only Ones.

Following Squeeze's second breakup in 1999, Tilbrook pursued a solo career, often touring around the UK and US in an RV, playing small venues. He released two solo albums, The Incomplete Glenn Tilbrook and Transatlantic Ping Pong. Tilbrook co-wrote some of the songs for his solo recordings with artists such as Ron Sexsmith, Chris Braide and Aimee Mann.

In 2006, the film documentary Glenn Tilbrook: One for the Road was released. It followed Tilbrook on his November 2001 tour across the United States. In 2007, Tilbrook took time off from his solo career to tour once again with Squeeze who had reformed for the third time.

In April 2007, Tilbrook released The Past Has Been Bottled, the first in a five-disc series of remastered demos. The first release included early versions of tracks from Squeeze's East Side Story. The second volume, In The Sky Above, was released in the UK in November 2007, and covered the period from 1993 through 1998. The third volume, Dreams Are Made of This, was released in November 2009 and covered Squeeze's early years, from 1974 to 1980. The fourth volume "When Daylight Appears", was released in 2011 and covered the years 1985 to 1991. The fifth volume, "Upon The Rocks", was released in 2016 and covered the years 1981 to 1984.

In 2008, Tilbrook previewed new material while on tour with the Fluffers, two members of whom are also members of the latest Squeeze line-up.  A four-track single, "Binga Bong!", was released in November 2008. The album Pandemonium Ensues, credited to Glenn Tilbrook and The Fluffers, was released in March 2009. The 14-track album was produced by Tilbrook and Andrew J. Jones, and mixed by Bob Clearmountain.  It featured guest appearances from Johnny Depp on "Too Close to the Sun" and Depp's then girlfriend, Vanessa Paradis, on "Interest & Love".

In January 2010 it was announced that Tilbrook and Difford would be spending part of the coming summer in Italy, together writing songs for a new Squeeze album. The result of this was a 4-song CD of new demo recordings which emerged during their 2012 tour of the US. The duo toured the UK and US again in 2014–15 with a program they called 'The At Odds Couple'.

In 2014, Tilbrook released a mostly acoustic album titled "Happy Ending". Later that year, he was featured on the compilation Songs from a Stolen Spring that paired Western musicians with artists from the Arab Spring.  On the album, Tilbrook's performance of the Bob Marley and Peter Tosh song "Get Up, Stand Up" was meshed with Egyptian singer Dina El Wedidi's "Beyond These Doors".

Fluffers

The Fluffers is the name of Tilbrook's band when Tilbrook performs without Squeeze. They tour internationally, and consist of Tilbrook, Stephen Large (keyboards), Simon Hanson (drums) and Lucy Shaw (electric bass).

Personal life
Tilbrook has his own recording studio, 45RPM, in Charlton. It has been used by other bands such as Nine Below Zero. Tilbrook supports Charlton Athletic F.C. and in 1998 Squeeze released "Down in the Valley", a tribute to his boyhood team.

Tilbrook memorably sang the English national anthem before the start of the Euro 96 game at Wembley between England and Holland.

He is a supporter of the Love Hope Strength Foundation, a cancer charity founded by Mike Peters of The Alarm, and has played concerts in aid of the organisation, including one at base camp, Mount Everest.

He has four children.

Discography

 2001: "The Incomplete Glenn Tilbrook"
 2001: "The Completely Acoustic Glenn Tilbrook"
 2004: "Transatlantic Ping Pong"
 2007: "The Past Has Been Bottled: East Side Story Demos"
 2008: "In The Sky Above: The Demo Tapes 1993-1999"
 2009: "Dreams Are Made Of This: The Demo Tapes 1974-1980"
 2009: "Pandemonium Ensues" (Glenn Tilbrook & The Fluffers)
 2011: "The Co-Operative" (Glenn Tillbrook & Nine Below Zero)
 2011: "When Daylight Appears: The Demo Tapes 1985-1991"
 2014: "Happy Ending"
 2016: "Upon The Rocks: The Demo Tapes 1981-1984"

References

Further reading

External links

 Official website
 Official Squeeze website
 Official site for Glenn Tilbrook: One for the Road

1957 births
Living people
English rock guitarists
English male singers
English new wave musicians
People from Woolwich
Place of birth missing (living people)
Squeeze (band) members
Ivor Novello Award winners
Singers from London
Musicians from Kent
Male new wave singers
English male guitarists